Bill Hicks (born May 16, 1940) is a former American football player and coach.  He was the 15th head football at Howard Payne University in Brownwood, Texas, serving for four seasons, from 1982 to 1985, and compiling a record of 8–29–3. As a player, Hicks was an All-Southwest Conference center at Baylor University in 1961, and was named to the Baylor All-Decade team of the 1960s. Hick began his coaching career as an assistant at Texas College of Arts and Industries—now known as Texas A&M University–Kingsville and West Virginia University.  He returned to the Baylor to coach in 1969 and spent over a decade there as a defensive assistant. He was elected to the Baylor Athletics Hall of Fame in 2017. After leaving Howard Payne, he spent three years on the defensive staff at the University of Texas at Austin. He then coached at the high school level in Texas, retiring in 2013.

Head coaching record

References

1940 births
Living people
American football centers
Baylor Bears football coaches
Baylor Bears football players
Howard Payne Yellow Jackets football coaches
Texas Longhorns football coaches
Texas A&M–Kingsville Javelinas football coaches
West Virginia Mountaineers football coaches
High school football coaches in Texas
Sportspeople from Little Rock, Arkansas
Players of American football from Arkansas